Philip Joseph Barzilla (born January 25, 1979) is an American former Major League Baseball pitcher who played for the Houston Astros in .

Amateur career
A native of Houston, Texas, Barzilla attended Dulles High School (Sugar Land, Texas), Alvin Community College (Alvin, Texas), and Rice University. In 2000, he played collegiate summer baseball with the Falmouth Commodores of the Cape Cod Baseball League. Barzilla was selected by the Houston Astros in the 4th round of the 2001 MLB Draft.

Professional career
Barzilla made his only major league appearance on June 11, 2006, for the Astros against the Atlanta Braves, and faced only two batters. Brian Jordan singled off Barzilla before Todd Pratt flew to center field to end the inning. Barzilla's 1/3rd of an inning is the second shortest career of an Astros pitcher after Larry Yount's appearance in which he was injured whilst warming up on the mound and never threw a pitch. 

In 2011, Barzilla played for the Brother Elephants of the Chinese Professional Baseball League.

References

External links

CPBL

1979 births
Living people
American people of Italian descent
American expatriate baseball players in Mexico
American expatriate baseball players in Taiwan
Brother Elephants players
Baseball players from Houston
Corpus Christi Hooks players
Falmouth Commodores players
Houston Astros players
Lexington Legends players
Major League Baseball pitchers
Mexican League baseball pitchers
New Orleans Zephyrs players
Pittsfield Astros players
Rice Owls baseball players
Rojos del Águila de Veracruz players
Round Rock Express players
Salem Avalanche players
San Antonio Missions players
Tacoma Rainiers players
2006 World Baseball Classic players
Caribes de Anzoátegui players
Tigres del Licey players
American expatriate baseball players in Venezuela
American expatriate baseball players in the Dominican Republic
Surprise Scorpions players
Scottsdale Scorpions players
Dulles High School (Sugar Land, Texas) alumni